The 1997 Polish Speedway season was the 1997 season of motorcycle speedway in Poland.

Individual

Polish Individual Speedway Championship
The 1997 Individual Speedway Polish Championship final was held on 15 August at Częstochowa. Jacek Krzyżaniak won the Polish title.

Golden Helmet
The 1997 Golden Golden Helmet organised by the Polish Motor Union (PZM) was the 1997 event for the league's leading riders. The final was held at Wrocław on the 3 October. Tomasz Gollob won his fourth Golden Helmet Championship.

Junior Championship
 winner - Grzegorz Walasek

Silver Helmet
 winner - Rafał Dobrucki

Bronze Helmet
 winner - Rafał Okoniewski

Pairs

Polish Pairs Speedway Championship
The 1997 Polish Pairs Speedway Championship was the 1997 edition of the Polish Pairs Speedway Championship. The final was held on 20 June at Bydgoszcz.

Team

Team Speedway Polish Championship
The 1997 Team Speedway Polish Championship was the 1997 edition of the Team Polish Championship. Polonia Bydgoszcz won the gold medal. The team included the Gollob brothers, Piotr Protasiewicz and Henrik Gustafsson.

First Division

Play offs

Second Division

References

Poland Individual
Poland Team
Speedway
1997 in Polish speedway